Jindrak is a surname, being a derivative of the pre-7th century German name Heimric, which means "home rule". Notable people with the surname include:

Karl Jindrak (born 1972), Austrian table tennis player
Mark Jindrak (born 1977), American businessman, former professional wrestler, and actor